Attera Orbis Terrarum – Part I is the first of the two-part Attera Orbis Terrarum series of live DVDs by Swedish black metal band Dark Funeral. As well as consisting of two shows recorded at Tilburg, Netherlands, and Paris, France, on the European leg of Dark Funeral's Attera Orbis Terrarum tour in 2006, it includes a recording of a concert in Katowice, Poland, in 2005, and various amateur footage such as that of the band's debut concert in the Metal Nights Festival in Oslo, Norway, in 1994.

Track listing

Disc One

Live at Metalmania, Katowice, Poland, March 12, 2005
"Bleed for Satan" [Intro]
"The Arrival of Satan's Empire"
"Ravenna Strigoi Mortii"
"The Secrets of the Black Arts"
"Hail Murder"
"Open the Gates"
"Thus I Have Spoken"
"An Apprentice of Satan"
"Goddess of Sodomy"
"When Angels Forever Die"
"Armageddon Finally Comes"

Live at 013, Tilburg, Netherlands, March 5, 2006
"Intro"
"King Antichrist"
"Diabolis Interium"
"Ravenna Strigoi Mortii"
"The Arrival of Satan's Empire"
"Open the Gates"
"Vobiscum Satanas"
"666 Voices Inside"
"Attera Totus Sanctus"
"Bloodfrozen"
"Hail Murder"
"Atrum Regina"
"My Dark Desires"
"An Apprentice of Satan"

Disc Two

Live at La Locomotive, Paris, France, March 17, 2006
"Intro"
"King Antichrist"
"Diabolis Interium"
"Ravenna Strigoi Mortii"
"The Arrival of Satan's Empire"
"Open the Gates"
"Vobiscum Satanas"
"666 Voices Inside"
"Attera Totus Sanctus"
"Bloodfrozen"
"Hail Murder"
"Atrum Regina"
"My Dark Desires"
"An Apprentice of Satan"

Personnel
Lord Ahriman – guitars
Emperor Magus Caligula – vocals
Chaq Mol – guitars
B-Force – bass
Matte Modin – drums (2000–2007)

Dark Funeral video albums
2007 video albums
Live video albums
2007 live albums
Regain Records live albums
Regain Records video albums